The Daymán River (Spanish, Río Daymán) is a river of Uruguay. It is a tributary of the Uruguay River.

See also
List of rivers of Uruguay

References

Rand McNally, The New International Atlas, 1993.

Rivers of Uruguay
Tributaries of the Uruguay River
Rivers of Paysandú Department
Rivers of Salto Department